is a Japanese voice actress from Niigata Prefecture who is affiliated with I'm Enterprise. After graduating from the Japan Narration Actor Institute, she made her voice acting debut in 2019. She played her first main role in 2022 as Serufu, the protagonist of the anime series Do It Yourself!!. She has also played the role of Ange in Black Summoner and is scheduled to voice Ellie in Synduality.

Filmography

Anime
2019
Aikatsu on Parade! as Student

2022
Do It Yourself!! as Serufu Yua
Black Summoner as Ange

2023
Synduality as Ellie

References

External links
Agency profile 

I'm Enterprise voice actors
Japanese voice actresses
Living people
Year of birth missing (living people)
Voice actresses from Niigata Prefecture